Loureedia is a genus of velvet spiders that was first described by J. A. Miller in 2012. , it contained four species: L. annulipes, L. colleni, L. lucasi and L. phoenixi. This genus of velvet spiders that live underground are named after Lou Reed, guitarist and singer for the Velvet Underground. In 2020, researchers discovered the fourth species, L. phoenixi, in Iran. 

L. annulipes was formerly considered a member of Eresus.

See also

 List of organisms named after famous people (born 1900–1949)

References

Eresidae
Araneomorphae genera